Robert Cornelius Cook (September 20, 1909 – December 19, 1987) was an American Negro league pitcher in the 1930s.

A native of Vincennes, Indiana, Cook attended Bloomington High School in Bloomington, Indiana, where he played football and baseball. He played for the Indianapolis Athletics in 1937, and was inducted into the Monroe County Sports Hall of Fame in 2011. Cook died in Bloomington in 1987 at age 78.

References

External links
 and Seamheads

1909 births
1987 deaths
Indianapolis Athletics players
Baseball pitchers
Baseball players from Indiana
People from Vincennes, Indiana
20th-century African-American sportspeople